Osita may refer to:

 Chief Stephen Osita Osadebe (1936–2007), musician
 Osita Iheme (born 1982), Nigerian actor
 Echendu Osita (born 1987), Nigerian footballer
 Egbo Osita (born 1988), Nigerian footballer
 1837 Osita, an asteroid